Kalle Westerlund (22 September 1897 – 11 February 1972) was a Finnish wrestler. He was born in Helsinki, and was the brother of Edvard Westerlund and Emil Westerlund. He won an Olympic bronze medal in Greco-Roman wrestling in 1924. He competed at 1921 World Wrestling Championships, where he placed fourth.

References

External links
 

1897 births
1972 deaths
Olympic wrestlers of Finland
Wrestlers at the 1924 Summer Olympics
Finnish male sport wrestlers
Olympic bronze medalists for Finland
Olympic medalists in wrestling
Medalists at the 1924 Summer Olympics
Sportspeople from Helsinki
19th-century Finnish people
20th-century Finnish people